Finis E. Cowan (born October 16, 1929) is a former United States district judge of the United States District Court for the Southern District of Texas and is an attorney in private practice.

Education and career
Born on October 16, 1929, in Dallas, Texas, Cowan received a Bachelor of Arts degree from Rice University in 1951 and a Bachelor of Laws from the University of Texas School of Law in 1956, graduating Order of the Coif. He was a United States Marine Corps Lieutenant during the Korean War, from 1951 to 1953. He was in private practice in Houston, Texas from 1956 to 1977.

Federal judicial service
On May 19, 1977, Cowan was nominated by President Jimmy Carter to a seat on the Galveston Division of the United States District Court for the Southern District of Texas vacated by Judge James Latane Noel Jr. Cowan was confirmed by the United States Senate on June 13, 1977, and received his commission on June 14, 1977. Cowan served in that capacity for just over two years, resigning on June 30, 1979, and returning to private practice in Houston.

Post judicial service
Cowan has remained in the private practice of law since his resignation from the federal bench. He serves with the law firm of Yetter Coleman LLP and was in active service as of April 2018.

References

Sources
 

1929 births
Living people
Rice University alumni
University of Texas School of Law alumni
Judges of the United States District Court for the Southern District of Texas
United States district court judges appointed by Jimmy Carter
20th-century American judges
United States Marine Corps officers